Brevitalea aridisoli is a bacterium from the genus of Brevitalea which has been isolated from savanna soil from Mashare in Namibia.

References 

Acidobacteriota
Bacteria described in 2016